Epitheca princeps, the prince baskettail, is a species of emerald dragonfly in the family Corduliidae. It is found in North America.

The IUCN conservation status of Epitheca princeps is "LC", least concern, with no immediate threat to the species' survival. The population is stable. The IUCN status was reviewed in 2017.

Subspecies
These two subspecies belong to the species Epitheca princeps:
 Epitheca princeps princeps Hagen, 1861
 Epitheca princeps regina (Hagen in Selys, 1871)

References

Further reading

External links

 

Corduliidae
Articles created by Qbugbot
Insects described in 1861